These are the results of the women's floor competition, one of six events for female competitors in artistic gymnastics at the 2000 Summer Olympics in Sydney. The qualification and final rounds took place on September 17 and 25 at the Sydney SuperDome.

Medalists

Results

Qualification

Eighty-three gymnasts competed in the floor event during the qualification round on September 17.  The eight highest scoring gymnasts advanced to the final on September 25.  Each country was limited to two competitors in the final.

Final

Note:  originally placed sixth with 9.537, but she was disqualified in 2010 after it was discovered that she was underage when she competed.

References
Official Olympic Report
www.gymnasticsresults.com

Women's floor
2000
2000 in women's gymnastics
Women's events at the 2000 Summer Olympics